Klonowo (1908–1945: Klontal) is a village in the administrative district of Gmina Lubiewo, within Tuchola County, Kuyavian-Pomeranian Voivodeship, in north-central Poland.

In 2002 the village had a population of 643.

References

Klonowo